San Jose Airport may refer to:
San Jose International Airport, an international airport in San Jose, California, United States
Juan Santamaría International Airport, an international airport serving in San José, Costa Rica
Los Cabos International Airport, an international airport in San José del Cabo, Mexico
Evelio Javier Airport, a domestic airport in San Jose de Buenavista, Antique, Philippines
San Jose Airport (Mindoro), a domestic airport in San Jose, Occidental Mindoro, Philippines
San José Airport (Guatemala), an airport being constructed in Puerto San José, Guatemala

See also
Reid–Hillview Airport, a general aviation airport in San Jose, California, United States